The Dartmouth Skiway is a ski area in the northeastern United States, in Lyme, New Hampshire.

The mountain 

There are three lifts which serve the trails at the skiway, including the Winslow Mountain Quad, the Holt's Ledge Double, and the Magic Carpet Beginner Lift. These lifts give the ski area an uphill capacity of 3,300 skiers per hour. 

Snowmaking covers about seventy percent of the area with over fifteen snowguns. There is a terrain park located on the Winslow side. The Dartmouth Skiway Ski and Snowboard School has a staff of over 35 instructors. The slopes are patrolled by the Dartmouth Ski Patrol, a joint community and student first aid volunteer organization. The Dartmouth Ski Team hosts the alpine skiing events of the Dartmouth Winter Carnival there annually.

History 

Descended from an earlier, smaller operation on nearby Oak Hill in Hanover, the Dartmouth Skiway opened  in 1957 with a Pomalift on one peak. For the 1960–61 season, a T-bar was also erected for a novice slope. In 1968, a new trail pod was opened with a double chairlift, located across the street on Winslow Ledge.

In the 1970s and 1980s, many improvements were made to the area, including replacing the Pomalift with a Hall double chairlift and snowmaking installation. In the next ten years a CTEC quad chairlift was installed and the new McLane Family Lodge was constructed, replacing the previous one. Like many other New England ski resorts, it hosts events and functions in the off-season.

Dartmouth Skiway hosted the NCAA Skiing Championships in 1958 and 2003.

References

External links 
 Dartmouth Skiway
 Dartmouth Skiway on NewEnglandSkiHistory.com

Skiway, Dartmouth
Buildings and structures in Grafton County, New Hampshire
Ski areas and resorts in New Hampshire
Tourist attractions in Grafton County, New Hampshire
Lyme, New Hampshire